Dando (or Dandon) was an Illyrian who, according to Pliny the Elder, supposedly lived for 500 years or more.

References 

Illyrian people